Granulifusus martinorum is a species of sea snail, a marine gastropod mollusk in the family Fasciolariidae, the spindle snails, the tulip snails and their allies.

Description
The size of an adult shell of this species varies between 14 mm and 20 mm.

Distribution
This marine species occurs off the Philippines.

References

 Cernohorsky, W.O. (1987a) The taxonomy of some Indo-Pacific Mollusca part 14. With descriptions of two new species. Records of the Auckland Institute and Museum, 24, 107–122
 Snyder M.A. (2013) One new, one newly placed, and two old Granulifusus (Gastropoda: Fasciolariidae). Gloria Maris 52(5): 115–122.

External links
 

martinorum
Gastropods described in 1987